Wynsige was a medieval Bishop of Dorchester.

Wynsige was consecrated between 909 and 925 and died between 934 and 945.

Citations

References

External links
 

Bishops of Dorchester (Mercia)
10th-century deaths
Year of birth unknown
Year of death unknown